The Comic-Con Museum is a museum dedicated to comics and popular arts located in Balboa Park, San Diego, California. The museum is a part of the San Diego Comic-Con International.

History 

The Comic-Con Museum is a year-round experience dedicated to comics and popular arts, similar to the annual Comic-Con International convention. The Comic-Con Museum replaced the former San Diego Hall of Champions Museum, located in  Balboa Park. The building was offered to Comic-Con by the City of San Diego in March of 2017. Comic-Con Museum plans to amplify pop culture, having rotating exhibits, galleries, education centers, etc. The museum opened in summer of 2021 and will be completed in phases until the year 2024.  Many popular characters have been featured at the museum's exhibitions including Batman, Wonder Woman, Pac-Man, and Spider-Man. Although there is no specific criteria for which characters or series get chosen, the museum chooses their exhibits based around all forms of art such as film, written word, original art, scripts and much more.

Special exhibits

Batman 
Batman is a widely known superhero. Regardless of not having powers, he is one of the main faces for superheroes. In 2019, on Comic-Con's 50th anniversary, Batman was the first inductee into the San Diego Comic-Con Museum’s Hall of Fame. Adam Smith, the museum's executive director stated, “We needed to start somewhere, and the 80th anniversary of Batman made it a good 2019 choice.” At the opening, the DC Comic publishers, Warner Bros, the artists and writers and Michael Uslan were in attendance. Michael Uslan was the executive producer of the 1989 Batman movie, which starred Michael Keaton and Jack Nicholson, which transformed Batman from a comic book character into a pop culture phenomenon. It was through various projects that Uslan was finally able to create the persona and aura that he felt Batman deserved.

Spider-Man 

On July 1st, 2022, Comic-Con Museum opened a new exhibit—Spider-Man: Beyond Amazing -- The Exhibition—created by Semmel Exhibitions and Marvel Entertainment dedicated to Spider-Man. The exhibit includes artifacts from Spider-Man comics, movies, animation, toys, video games and merchandise from the 1960s to present day. As co-curators, Dr. Ben Saunders and Patrick A. Reed designed the exhibit to showcase Spider-Man’s appearances with real-world events, the creators, and the history of Spider-Man. Their three-level approach included the cultural history of Spider-Man throughout the years and how the character has been incorporated in real-world social issues; the publishing history and creative team behind creating the comics, which includes Steve Ditko (editor) and Stan Lee (writer); and finally, a look at the evolution and expansion of the multiverse that was created around the character of Spider-Man.

The Spider-Man Exhibit highlights the relatability of the superhero. When the topic of Spider-Man came up during C.B. Celuski and Nick Lowe’s visit to the Comic-Con Museum, Celuski cited how “Luckily, Spider-Man has a mask, so anyone can see themselves in that, but the more we do this sort of thing, these characters will resonate with people.” Celuski, an editor-in-chief at Marvel, believes that with things like the Comic-Con Museum’s Spider-Man Exhibit, it is a reminder of why fans of movies and superheroes seem to relate to the characters in the Spider-Man universe, whether that be the original Peter Parker from the 1960s to today with representative characters such as Gwen Stacy and Miles Morales. Co-Creator of the exhibit, Patrick Reed stated the museum's focus was to “Create massive immersive experiences that combine physical objects and high-resolution digital imagery, “selfie moments” featuring life-sized foam sculptures produced by Gentle Giant, and other cutting-edge features." Viewers can guide themselves throughout the exhibit but could also spend hours analyzing the huge range of artifacts, original art, and digital canvases. Featured artists include Sara Pichelli, John Romita Sr, John Buscema, and Gil Kane.

Hemingway in Comics 

The Hemingway in Comics exhibit highlights Ernest Hemingway’s presence in comics, including more than 120 appearances from 18 countries. Inspired by Robert K. Elder’s book of the same title, the exhibition explores what it means to be a pop-culture icon and how that image can change over time.  The museum showcases 40 pieces of original artwork from various artists that are featured in the book. The exhibit emphasizes Hemingway’s flaws and complexities, both as a person and as an icon; some depictions are reverent, some love Hemingway, and others make fun of him.  Some of the works highlight instances of his anti-semitic, sexist, and hyper masculine vision of society from the perspective of the artists. The exhibit depicts Hemingway’s inconsistent personality through both mockery and realism to make known what it means to become an icon and how a person’s image can change over time.

Community outreach 

In collaboration with Feeding San Diego, the Comic-Con Museum launched a competition for K-12 students to design hunger fighting superheroes. The purpose of this project was to use the newly designed super heroes to educate the public on Feeding San Diego's efforts to save extra food from grocery stores, and restaurants then provide it to people in need. After the contest decided on the two winners, the designs were turned into costumes by prop designer and costumer Allan Lavigne who previously worked on Marvel's Iron Man and Captain America franchises. These newly designed superheroes are now on display at the Comic-con museum.

References

External links 
Comic-Con Museum

Museums in San Diego